Robert Watson Black (17 July 1915 – 1979) was an English professional footballer who played in the Football League for Clapton Orient and West Ham United as a wing half.

Personal life 
Black served in the Royal Navy during the Second World War.

Career statistics

References

English footballers
English Football League players

Association football wing halves
Leyton Orient F.C. players
1915 births
1979 deaths
People from Washington, Tyne and Wear
Footballers from Tyne and Wear
West Ham United F.C. players
Royal Navy personnel of World War II